The Knights-Morey House is a historic house on Province Road in Goshen, New Hampshire.  Built about 1830, it is one of a regionally distinctive cluster of plank-frame house, with a number of features unusual within that cluster.  The house was listed on the National Register of Historic Places in 1985.

Description and history
It is a -story wooden structure, with a clapboarded exterior and gabled roof. The roof is steeply pitched, enabling the space beneath to house a chamber running the width of the house. The structure's framing consists of wooden planks three inches thick, placed vertically with horizontal dowels for lateral stability. It has two brick chimneys, one placed near the center, and another at the west end. The main facade is five bays wide, with sash windows arranged symmetrically on either side of the center entrance. The entry door is flanked by sidelight windows. A single-story ell, its front flush with that of the main block, extends to the right.

This house was built c. 1830, and is one of a regionally significant cluster of plank-frame houses found in the town.  The house is locally distinct from other period plank-frame houses because of its high-pitch roof, and for the use of dowel-like posts to support the second-story room.

See also
National Register of Historic Places listings in Sullivan County, New Hampshire

References

Houses on the National Register of Historic Places in New Hampshire
Houses completed in 1830
Houses in Goshen, New Hampshire
1830 establishments in New Hampshire
National Register of Historic Places in Sullivan County, New Hampshire